Jacob "Jake" Bornheimer (June 29, 1927 – September 10, 1986) was an American professional basketball player.

Born in New Brunswick, New Jersey, Bornheimer played collegiately for the Muhlenberg College.

He played for the Philadelphia Warriors (1948–50) in the NBA for 75 games.  His older brother, Bill, played basketball at Georgetown, from 1940 to 1942.

BAA/NBA career statistics

Regular season

Playoffs

References

External links

1927 births
1986 deaths
Basketball players from New Jersey
Centers (basketball)
Muhlenberg Mules men's basketball players
Sportspeople from New Brunswick, New Jersey
Philadelphia Warriors players
Power forwards (basketball)
American men's basketball players